Live from Baghdad is a 2002 American television war drama film directed by Mick Jackson and co-written by Robert Wiener, based on Wiener's book of the same title. The film premiered on HBO on December 7, 2002, during the prelude stage of the Iraq War.

Michael Keaton stars as Wiener, a CNN on-location producer in Baghdad, Iraq during the Gulf War in 1991. The film focuses on the news media's (primarily CNN's) coverage of the war. Fundamentally an action–drama, the characters grapple with the ethics and implications of 24-hour journalism in the days leading up to and during the United States-led bombing of Baghdad.

Plot

On August 2, 1990, Iraqi forces and tanks roll into Kuwait City, as the Iraqi invasion of Kuwait begins. In Atlanta, CNN picks Robert Wiener and his crew to go to Baghdad and cover the invasion. At Rome International Airport, Wiener meets his colleague and producer Ingrid Formanek. Wiener and his crew arrive in Baghdad on August 23, and stay at the Al-Rasheed Hotel.

As they settle in their hotel rooms, they notice that they are being monitored. The crew report their first story on a young British boy held as a hostage by Saddam Hussein. As they continue to report stories, they get pressured by the Iraqi government. Wiener later meets the Iraqi Minister of Information Naji Al Hadithi, and requests pieces of equipment and an interview with Hussein. As the movie goes on, Wiener and Al Hadithi become friends.

Wiener and his crew get access to interview Americans forced to stay in the country by the Iraqi government. The Iraqis use the American hostages as human shields for potential bombing sites. After Wiener's crew interview an American named Bob Vinton, Vinton goes missing. Wiener becomes worried about Vinton. Later, Al Hadithi gives CBS and Dan Rather the Saddam Hussein interview. Instead of the Hussein interview, Al Hadithi gives Wiener and his crew a trip to Kuwait. They arrive in Jahra Air Force Base, Kuwait on October 17. The crew cover the incubator story in three Kuwaiti hospitals, but then Iraqis call off the interviews because the CNN crew broke some ground rules. As soon as they arrive back in Baghdad, Wiener and the crew become the story as the only Americans to be in Kuwait.

After an argument between Wiener and Al Hadithi, Al Hadithi agrees to give CNN a Saddam Hussein interview. On October 29, and the CNN crew interview Saddam Hussein at one of his presidential palaces. In the interview, Hussein states that Iraq withdrawing from Kuwait would be like the U.S. withdrawing from Hawaii. The crew then covers the release of American hostages from Iraq. Wiener then finds Bob Vinton and is emotionally moved by his being safe.

The United Nations gives Iraq until January 15, 1991 to withdraw from Kuwait, or face military action. As the deadline comes to an end the crew sees that the Iraqi Army is installing anti-aircraft guns in Baghdad. The crew then gets a piece of equipment called the four-wire, which gives them communications to CNN in Atlanta. The four-wire is essentially a direct phone line to their CNN facility in Jordan. From that point it can hit the satellite above and then go to the CNN headquarters in Atlanta. The Iraqis eventually find out that the crew have established communication with Atlanta. The CNN crew is the only foreign news group with the four wire. On January 9, the crew eventually believe that there will be war.

Bernard Shaw arrives in Baghdad again on January 13 to interview Saddam Hussein again at the deadline. As soon as the deadline expires, streets in Baghdad are empty and businesses are shut down.  Americans and foreign news groups begin evacuating Baghdad on January 15 in fear of American bombing strikes. Wiener decides to stay, and some members of the crew decide to leave. At around 3 a.m. on January 17, U.S. F-117 Nighthawk stealth bombers begin to bomb Baghdad. Iraqi soldiers begin to fire anti-aircraft guns into the sky to shoot down the bombers. As soon as the bombing strikes begin, CNN correspondents Bernard Shaw, John Holliman and Peter Arnett begin to report and describe the bombings on the four-wire communicator. The reports are broadcast live on CNN in America. The film shows the points of view from Saddam Hussein and U.S. President George H. W. Bush watching the CNN reports. It also intersperses actual archival footage of news anchors from rival networks, having to report off CNN's live feed, since CNN was the only news source transmitting during the bombing of Baghdad. Other archival footage is of Dick Cheney, during a news conference as Bush's Defense Secretary, stating "The best coverage I've seen of what transpired in Baghdad was on CNN", and NBC News anchor Tom Brokaw stating, "CNN used to be called the little network that could. It's no longer a little network."

At around 5 a.m., the crew is forced to stop reporting by Al Hadithi and Iraqi soldiers.

Most of the crew leaves Baghdad, including Formanek and Shaw. Wiener stays, returning to America on January 23. The film ends showing the destruction of buildings from bombings in Baghdad.

Cast
 Michael Keaton as Robert Wiener, a CNN producer who braves Iraq and refuses to flee when all the other news broadcasters have already fled. He is resourceful in his dealings with Iraqi bureaucracy. For his performance he was nominated for a Golden Globe award.
 Helena Bonham Carter as Ingrid Formanek, Robert's colleague who agrees to leave Baghdad with the other reporters. There are hints that she is attracted to Robert romantically. She gained an Emmy and Golden Globe nomination for her part in the film.
 David Suchet as Naji Al-Hadithi the Minister of Information who befriends Robert Wiener and provides Robert with insight into the Iraqi side of the war.
 Paul Guilfoyle as Ed Turner, the head of CNN. 
 Michael Cudlitz as Tom Murphy, CNN reporter who comes as part of Wiener's crew initially and makes a few reports, but eventually leaves Iraq.
 Joshua Leonard as Mark Biello, the crew's cameraman.
 Lili Taylor as Judy Parker, the crew's sound technician who accompanies Robert and the crew.
 Hamish Linklater as Richard Roth, CNN reporter called in from Amman to replace Murphy. Roth eventually leaves Iraq as well, to be replaced by Holliman, but stays on the course as he is seen reporting with a gas mask from Tel Aviv shortly after the Gulf War begins.
 John Carroll Lynch as John Holliman, veteran CNN reporter assigned to the Oil Desk. He later joins Wiener's crew in Baghdad to report the action from the spot, one of the three reporters to cover bombing of Baghdad live.
 Bruce McGill as Peter Arnett, veteran New Zealand-American CNN reporter with wartime experience, joins Wiener's crew after political tensions heighten, one of the three reporters to cover bombing of Baghdad live.
 Robert Wisdom as Bernard Shaw, veteran CNN anchorman who travels to Baghdad twice to join Wiener, first to interview Saddam and second when it was believed that Saddam would give another interview where he might call off the stand-off with the West. However that interview never takes place and the Gulf War begins on January 17, with Shaw is one of three reporters covering bombing of Baghdad live.

Production
Filming took place in Morocco and Los Angeles.

Critical reception
The film received positive reviews from film critics. Review aggregator Rotten Tomatoes reports that 88% out of eight professional critics give the film a positive review, with a rating average of 7/10.

See also
 CNN
 Four-wire circuit
 Four-wire terminating set

References

External links 
 
 
 Alternet critical article about film - "HBO Recycles the Incubator Hoax"

2002 films
2002 television films
2002 drama films
2000s war drama films
American war drama films
Drama films based on actual events
American drama television films
Films about journalism
Films about television
Films about war correspondents
Films based on non-fiction books
Films directed by Mick Jackson
Films scored by Steve Jablonsky
Films set in 1990
Films set in 1991
Films set in Baghdad
Films set in Kuwait
Films shot in Los Angeles
Films shot in Morocco
Films with screenplays by John Patrick Shanley
Gulf War films
HBO Films films
Television films based on actual events
Television films based on books
War films based on actual events
War television films
2000s American films